Central Campus of Technology, informally known as Hattisar Campus, was established in 1972 and is one of the constituent campuses of Tribhuvan University (Nepal).

References

Tribhuvan University
1972 establishments in Nepal